George T. Snyder (September 27, 1848 – August 2, 1905) was a Major League Baseball pitcher who played in  with the Philadelphia Athletics.

Snyder died in his home town of Philadelphia, Pennsylvania in 1905 of angina pectoris.

References

External links

1848 births
1905 deaths
Major League Baseball pitchers
Baseball players from Pennsylvania
Philadelphia Athletics (AA) players
19th-century baseball players